The 1992 WFA Cup Final was the 22nd final of the WFA Cup, England's primary cup competition for women's football teams. The showpiece event was played under the auspices of the Women's Football Association (WFA).

Match

Southampton ended up losing the game 4–0.

Summary

References

External links
 
 Report at WomensFACup.co.uk

FA
Women's FA Cup finals
Doncaster Rovers Belles L.F.C. matches 
April 1992 sports events in the United Kingdom